Amata lagosensis is a moth of the family Erebidae. It was described by George Hampson in 1907. It is found in Nigeria.

References

 

Endemic fauna of Nigeria
lagosensis
Moths described in 1907
Moths of Africa